Buddhisena Dayaratne Wickrama (19 January 1939 – 5 January 2023), popularly known as Buddhi Wickrama, was A Sri Lankan actor in cinema, theater, and television. He is most notable for the roles played in the television dramas Tharadevi, Suseema, Boomarangaya, and Amba Yahaluvo.

Biography 
Wickrama was born in Heenatigala, Galle, British Ceylon on 19 January 1939, as the second child of the family. His father worked in the Department of Posts, and he had one elder brother and two younger sisters. He completed his primary education from Heenatigala Sariputhra College and his secondary education from Mahinda College.

While in school, he performed in the stage play Avurudda produced by Vinnie Vitharana. After that, he worked in the Department of Surveys in 1959 as a designer, where he met fellow actors Dhamma Jagoda, Santin Gunawardena, Shelton de Silva, and Mervyn Jayathunga. During this period, Buddhi joined the "Kala Pela" drama troupe founded by G. D. L. Perera. In 1962, he made his first theatre appearance in Perera's play Magul Mathe. Other stage plays he performed in include Andare, Parasthawa, Kāmarē Porē, Janēlaya, Thotupala, Mehew Lokayak, Kontharē, Manaranjana Weda Warjana, Hotabari Yuddē, Apāyē Avurudu, and Sri Wickrama. After leaving the Survey Department, Buddhi joined the Ceramics Corporation. His last stage performance was R. R. Samarakoon's Doovili.

In 1964, he made his first cinema appearance in the film Saama, directed by Perera. In 1967, he acted in the film Sadol Kandulu. He also appeared in foreign films and serials such as The Village by the Sea, Good Marriages, The Greatest Gift, and Water. He portrayed a friend of Gorin Mudalali in the film Welikathara, and as a robber in the film Haralakshaya.

In 1975, Wickrama married Irangani Wannakukorala and the couple had one daughter. They met while both were working at the Ceramics Corporation.

His first television appearance came through the 1998 serial Eka Mawakage Daruwo directed by Lucien Bulathsinhala. He then appeared in more than 40 television serials over two decades, including Kumarihami, Palingu Menike, Thara Devi, Doo Daruwo, Amba Yahaluvo, Gam Peraliya, Suseema, and Bawa Tharana as his final television appearance in 2012. Among them is the role he played as Punsiri's father in the teledrama Du Daruwo and the role 'Kendalanda' in the popular teen serial Amba Yahaluvo, which received critical acclaim.

In 2014, he underwent bypass heart surgery and retired from acting. Wickrama later became confined to a wheelchair, and then bedridden after suffering a dislocated hip. In 2017, he was diagnosed with Parkinson's disease. Wickrama died on 5 January 2023, at the age of 83. He was undergoing treatment at the General Hospital in Homagama at the time of his death.

Selected television serials 

 Amba Yahaluvo
 Bawa Tharana
 Doo Daruwo
 Gamanaanthaya
 Gam Peraliya
 Hiruta Muwawen
 Kadathurawa
 Kalu Makara
 Kumarihami
 Palingu Menike
 Pitagankarayo
 Punchi Hapannu
 Sandagalathanna
 Sihina Nimnaya
 Sihinayak Addara
 Sonduru Sithaththi
 Suseema
 Thara Devi

Filmography

References

External links
 

1939 births
2023 deaths
Sri Lankan male film actors
Sri Lankan Buddhists
Sri Lankan male television actors
Sri Lankan male stage actors
People from Galle
20th-century Sri Lankan male actors
21st-century Sri Lankan male actors
Alumni of Mahinda College